Elections were held in the Australian state of Queensland on 3 May 1947 to elect the 62 members of the state's Legislative Assembly.

The election was the first that the Labor government had contested under Premier Ned Hanlon, who had been in office for 14 months by the time of the poll.

The election resulted in Labor receiving a sixth term in office. It was the first Queensland election at which all seats were contested by at least two candidates.

Key dates

Results

Seats changing party representation

This table lists changes in party representation at the 1947 election.

 Members listed in italics did not recontest their seats.
 East Toowoomba was held by the Country Party at the previous election. It was won by Labor at the 1946 by-election.

See also
 Members of the Queensland Legislative Assembly, 1944–1947
 Members of the Queensland Legislative Assembly, 1947–1950
 Candidates of the Queensland state election, 1947
 Hanlon Ministry

Notes

References

Elections in Queensland
1947 elections in Australia
1940s in Queensland
May 1947 events in Australia